Virginia's 31st House of Delegates district election, 2001, held 5 November 2001, was a contest between Republican Scott Lingamfelter and Democrat Michele "Mickie" Krause. Prior to the general election, Lingamfelter had defeated Dell P. Ennis and G.E. "Buck" Waters in the Republican primary. Lingamfelter was the only Republican in that primary to sign a no-new-taxes pledge.

Results

Republican primary

General election

See also
Virginia's 31st House of Delegates district

References

2001 Virginia elections
November 2001 events in the United States